The  (KIBR) is an ancillary establishment of Yokohama City University in Yokohama, Japan. The KIBR was founded in 1942 by Hitoshi Kihara to promote biological research in Japan. The Institute maintains a store of genetic resources - about 6,000 varieties of wheat and 800 of capsicum (chili peppers).

Research
Although the KIBR's primary focus is plant biology, research there covers a wide variety of biological fields, including biochemistry, cell biology, genetics, informatics, and biotechnology. The results of the research conducted at KIBR are regularly published in peer reviewed publications.

Education
In addition to being a research institute, the KIBR functions as an institution of higher education, constituting the Graduate School of Nanobioscience, Yokohama City University. The graduate school offers a five-year doctoral program and a two-year master course for university graduates.

Organization
Department of Plant Genetic Resource (Prof. Tomohiro Ban)
Department of Plant Genome Science (Prof. Yasunari Ogihara)
Department of Plant Biotechnology (Prof. Yukihisa Shimada)
Plant Functional Genomics Research Group (Visiting Prof. Minami Matsui)
Plant Genomic Network Research Team (Visiting Prof. Motoaki Seki)
Plant Genome Engineering Research Unit (Visiting Prof. Seiichi Toki)
Kihara Memorial Room

History
Founded in May 1942 in Kyoto by Hitoshi Kihara, known for the proposal of the genome theory, the KIBR moved to Minami-ku, Yokohama in May 1957. The institute was able to remain open and continue its work throughout the Second World War. It became an ancillary establishment of Yokohama City University in April 1984, and relocated to the Maioka Research Park in Totsuka-ku, Yokohama in December 1994.

On 15 September 2010, the institute was visited by the Emperor of Japan Akihito and Empress Michiko.

Kihara Memorial Room
The Kihara Memorial Room exhibits historical records of Hitoshi Kihara and has been open at the KIBR since 4 March 2010. The opening ceremony was attended by Fumihito, Prince Akishino.

See also 
 Kihara Memorial Foundation Academic Award

References

External links 
 

Yokohama City University
Biological research institutes
Educational institutions established in 1942
Research institutes in Japan
1942 establishments in Japan